Istiblennius colei is a species of combtooth blenny found in the western Pacific Ocean, around the Philippines.  Males of this species can reach a maximum of  SL, while females reach a maximum of  SL. The specific name of this blenny honours Howard I. Cole (1892-1966) who was the Chief Chemist for the Philippine Health Service at the leper colony on Culion Island, Philippines, which is the type locality.

References

colei
Fish described in 1934